Marinula striata is a species of small air-breathing land snail, a terrestrial pulmonate gastropod mollusc in the family Ellobiidae.

This species is known to occur under stones at the shore line on a number of New Zealand's islands: Antipodes Islands, Auckland Islands, Campbell Island, and Stewart Island.

References

 Powell A. W. B., New Zealand Mollusca, William Collins Publishers Ltd, Auckland, New Zealand 1979 

Ellobiidae
Gastropods of New Zealand
Gastropods described in 1924